Ricardo Viera (December 1945–April 1, 2020) was a Cuban artist specializing in painting, drawing, and engraving.

In 1973 he studied at the School of the Museum of Fine Arts, Boston, Massachusetts. In 1974 he graduated with a Master of Fine Arts from the Rhode Island School of Design in Providence, Rhode Island.

Principal Curatorships
Between 1988-1989 he was the curator of the 24th Annual Contemporary American Art Exhibition. In 1989 he made the curatorships of the exhibitions William Rau. Photographer: The Lehigh Valley Railroad Photographs. In 1994 he worked also in American Voices: Cuban American Photography in the U.S.', in FotoFest'94, Fifth Biennial International Festival of Photography, Houston, U.S. In 1998 he was the curator of Josef Bajus. Design Explorations Mixed Media, in DuBois Gallery, Lehigh University Art Galleries, Pennsylvania, U.S.

Individual Exhibitions
In 1979 he exhibited his works in Ricardo Viera., in the Sardoni Art Gallery, Wilkes College, Wilkes Bane, Pennsylvania, U.S. In 1985 he presented Island on my mind in the Museum of Contemporary Hispanic Art (MOCHA), New York City, U.S. In 1986 he made other personal exhibition: Ricardo Viera: Computer Graphics 1986, in the Kemerer Museum, Bethlehem, Pennsylvania, U.S. And in 1987 he presented his works in Ricardo Viera: Computer Art, in the East Stroudsburg University Art Gallery, East Stroudsburg, Pennsylvania, U.S.

Collective Exhibitions
He was part of many collective exhibitions, among them we can quote in 1977 Re encuentro Cubano 1977, Museo Cubano de Arte y Cultura, Miami, Florida, U.S. Some of his works were selected to conform the V (1981) and VII (1986) Bienal de San Juan del Grabado Latinoamericano y del Caribe, San Juan, Puerto Rico. In 1982 he was one of the selected artists to conform Young Hispanics U.S., in the 27th Annual Contemporary Art. Ralph Wilson Gallery, Lehigh University Art Galleries, Bethlehem, Pennsylvania, U.S. And in 1990 he was also included in the Urban Anthropology, in the Sculptors Gallery, New York City, U.S.

Awards
He obtained many awards, such as the Cintas Foundation Fellowship, New York City 1974-1975. And in 1980, 1981 and 1984, he gained the Pennsylvania Governor's Award for Excellence in the Arts.

Collections
His works can be found as part of important collections, such as Cintas Foundation, New York, U.S., the Cleveland Museum, Cleveland, Ohio, U.S., the Noyes Museum, New Jersey, U.S. and also can be found in the Tel Aviv Museum, Tel Aviv, in Israel.

References
The Washington Post, OUR JOURNEYS/OUR STORIES: PORTRAITURE & IDENTITY IN PHOTOGRAPHY, March 21, 2004.
American Federation of Arts, Who's who in American art, Issue 6536; R. R. Bowker., 1980; 

Cuban contemporary artists
Living people
1945 births
School of the Museum of Fine Arts at Tufts alumni
Rhode Island School of Design alumni